Lloyd John Muller (born June 21, 1932) is a farmer and former political figure in Saskatchewan. He represented Shellbrook-Torch River from 1982 to 1991 in the Legislative Assembly of Saskatchewan as a Progressive Conservative.

He was born in Prince Albert, Saskatchewan, the son of Ernest Muller. In 1958, Muller married Doreen Lillian Rask. He served as deputy speaker in the Saskatchewan assembly. Muller lived in Shellbrook. He was defeated by Jack Langford when he ran for re-election to the assembly in 1991.

References 

1932 births
Living people
Politicians from Prince Albert, Saskatchewan
Progressive Conservative Party of Saskatchewan MLAs
20th-century Canadian politicians